The Pinole Tuff Formation is a geologic formation of the East Bay region of the San Francisco Bay Area in California.

It is found near Pinole and Rodeo area at San Pablo Bay and the Briones Hills of western Contra Costa County.

Fossils
It preserves fossils, including Oncorhynchus rastrosus and fragments of a proto-hipparion prehistoric horse, dating back to the Neogene period.

See also

 List of fossiliferous stratigraphic units in California
 Paleontology in California

References

 

Geologic formations of California
Geology of Contra Costa County, California
Tuff formations
Neogene California
Pinole, California